This is a list of all cricketers who have played first-class or List A matches for Industrial Development Bank of Pakistan cricket team. The team played twenty first-class matches between 1980 and 1981 and four List A matches in 1981. Seasons given are first and last seasons; the player did not necessarily play in all the intervening seasons.

Players
 Adnan Butt, 1979/80
 Anwar Miandad, 1979/80-1981/82
 Ashfaq Malik, 1980/81-1981/82
 Ghaffar Khan, 1979/80-1980/81
 Iqbal Chippa, 1979/80-1981/82
 Jalaluddin, 1979/80-1981/82
 Mohammad Afzal, 1981/82
 Mohinder Kumar, 1980/81-1981/82
 Munir-ul-Haq, 1981/82
 Qaiser Hussain, 1980/81-1981/82
 Sagheer Abbas, 1979/80-1981/82
 Sajid Khan, 1980/81
 Saleem Anwar, 1980/81
 Saleem Yousuf, 1979/80-1981/82
 Shahid Mahboob, 1979/80-1981/82
 Shahid Rana, 1980/81
 Shaukat Mirza, 1979/80-1980/81
 Tahir Rasheed, 1979/80-1980/81
 Tanvir Ali, 1980/81-1981/82
 Vakil Tatari, 1979/80
 Zia-ur-Rehman, 1980/81

References

Industrial Development Bank of Pakistan cricketers